Shams al-Din was the leader of the Sarbadars of Sabzewar from 1347 until around 1348.

Reign

Shams al-Din was the son of Fazl Allah and the brother of 'Abd al-Razzaq and Wajih ad-Din Mas'ud. As such, he had significant support amongst the members of the Bashtini gentry and the military. In 1347 they moved against Kulu Isfandiyar, who at that time controlled Sabzewar, and overthrew him. Shams al-Din then took control of the government. He was only able to hold on to power for about a year. A failure to pay the troops resulted in him in losing the favor of the military, and eventually he had so few supporters that the pro-dervish aristocrat Khwaja Shams al-Din 'Ali was able to stage a coup and force him to abdicate in 1348.

References

Smith, Jr., John Masson. The History of the Sarbadar Dynasty 1336-1381 A.D. and Its Sources. The Hague: Mouton, 1970. 

Sarbadars